This is a list of sports played in the Asian Games and other major affiliated games organized by the Olympic Council of Asia. On 29 June 2009, the OCA announced major changes to the event lists in the five major events, in particular aiming to restrict each sport to be played in not more than one event, although exemptions may be made. The first round of changes commenced with the 2014 Asian Games when the number of events was recommended to be restricted to 35 with 28 Olympic sports and up to a maximum of seven non-Olympic sports. Some events currently in the Asian Games programme may henceforth be relegated to the newly formed Asian Indoor-Martial Arts Games which was first held in 2013 or to the Asian Beach Games.

Asian Games
The figures in each cell indicate the number of events for each sport contested at the respective Games; a bullet (•) denotes that the sport was contested as a demonstration sport.

Disciplines from the same sport are grouped under the same color:

 Aquatics –
 Baseball –
 Basketball –
 Board games –
 Canoeing –
 Cycling –
 Gymnastics –
 Roller sports –
 Rugby union –
 Volleyball

Demonstration Asian Games sports

The following sports or disciplines have been demonstrated at the Asian Games for the years shown, but have never been included on the official Asian Games program:
 Muaythai (1998)

Asian Winter Games
The figures in each cell indicate the number of events for each sport contested at the respective Games; a bullet (•) denotes that the sport was contested as a demonstration sport.

Disciplines from the same sport are grouped under the same color:

 Skating – 
 Skiing

Asian Indoor and Martial Arts Games
The figures in each cell indicate the number of events for each sport contested at the respective Games; a bullet (•) denotes that the sport was contested as a demonstration sport.

Disciplines from the same sport are grouped under the same color:

 Aquatics –
 Board games –
 Cycling –
 Kabaddi –
 Roller sports –
 Wrestling

Demonstration Asian Games sports

The following sports or disciplines have been demonstrated at the Asian Indoor and Martial Arts Games for the years shown, but have never been included on the official Asian Games program:
Drone racing (2021)
Teqball (2021)

Asian Beach Games
The figures in each cell indicate the number of events for each sport contested at the respective Games; a bullet (•) denotes that the sport was contested as a demonstration sport.

Disciplines from the same sport are grouped under the same color:

 Air sports –
 Aquatics –
 Extreme sports –
 Triathlon

Asian Youth Games
The figures in each cell indicate the number of events for each sport contested at the respective Games; a bullet (•) denotes that the sport was contested as a demonstration sport.

Disciplines from the same sport are grouped under the same color:

 Aquatics

See also

Commonwealth Games sports
Olympic sports
World Games sports

References

External links
 Olympic Council of Asia

Sports
 
Sports at multi-sport events by competition